Strings of Passion is a Bollywood drama film released on 17 January 2014. It was directed by Sanghamitra Chaudhari. The film stars Zeenat Aman, Indrani Haldar, Shubh Mukherjee and Rajesh Sharma.

Plot 
Strings Of Passion is an urban commercial flick which tells the story of three men, Neel, Aman and Amit. They are young and dynamic guys who run the band "Strings of Passion" but are shadowed by the influence of drugs, broken love and bad parenting.

Cast 
 Zeenat Aman
 Indrani Haldar
 Rajesh Sharma
 Shubh Mukherjee
 Ekavali Khanna
 Avlok Nagpal
 Paru Gambhir
 Amit Sarkar
 Sangita Sonali
 Mishti in an item number

Soundtrack

See also
 Bollywood films of 2014

References

External links
 

2010s Hindi-language films
Bengali-language Indian films
2010s Bengali-language films
2014 films
Indian drama films
2014 drama films
Hindi-language drama films